Evil Ruins is an adventure for fantasy role-playing games published by Mayfair Games in 1984.

Plot summary
Evil Ruins is a scenario for character levels 2-5 based on Saxon legend and set in an actual historical castle.

Somewhere within the ruins of a castle is the secret to the mysterious death of Ethelwaine, heir to the throne of Tintagel.  If the player characters succeed in clearing things up, the Castle of Tintagel can be reclaimed as a religious retreat. The journey to the castle includes encounters with thieving squirrels, intelligent spiders, and an NPC whose help the adventurers need if they are to find their hidden destination.  The castle itself has been demolished by sinister forces and a four-level underground dungeon is left for the party to explore.

Publication history
Evil Ruins was written by Stephen T. Bourne and Martin F. King and was published by Mayfair Games in 1984 as a 32-page book. The adventure module was part of the Role Aids line and was suitable for Dungeons & Dragons or similar systems.

Reception
Rick Swan reviewed the adventure in The Space Gamer No. 72. He commented "In the introduction to Evil Ruins, the designers state that the module is intended as an 'intellectual challenge,' but don't take that claim too seriously.  For the most part, Evil Ruins is a straightforward search-the-dungeon adventure with a mystery grafted on to give the players some motivation."  Swan added that "Care has been taken to insured that each succeeding level is more forboding than the one before; bedrooms and storage chambers soon give way to bat caves and torture chambers, effectively increasing the tension as the adventure progresses."  He continued: "The main problem with Evil Ruins is that it's all too familiar.  Inside the castle, there are no real surprises for experienced players, what with the usual monsters (zombies, orcs, ghouls) guarding the usual treasures (gold, weapons, magic items).  Worse, the game comes to an awkward halt if the players don't stumble upon the correct artifact or NPC with the crucial clue that leads to the next encounter.  Independent-minded players may be frustrated by the amount of nudging needed from the GM to keep them on the right path."  Swan concluded his review by saying, "Still, Evil Ruins is a competent production and, in the RoleAids tradition, perfectly suited for Dungeons & Dragons fans.  Nothing special, but entertaining in a modest way."

Chris Hunter reviewed Evil Ruins for Imagine magazine, and stated that "Something which should make a good game with a little work is Evil Ruins published by Mayfair Games."

References

Fantasy role-playing game adventures
Role Aids
Role-playing game supplements introduced in 1984